Srećko Matko Džaja (born 29 October 1935) is a Bosnian Croat-German historian, medievalist and ottomanist.

Biography 

Džaja was born in Gornji Malovan near Kupres. He finished elementary school in 1947 in Dolac, Travnik and attended gymnasiums in Livno (1947–48), Dubrovnik (1948–49) and Visoko (1949–56), where he graduated. As an apprentice of the Franciscan Province of Bosnia he spent a year in a novitiate from 1953 to 1954 in Kraljeva Sutjeska. Afterward, Džaja studied theology at the Franciscn Theology in Sarajevo from 1956 to 1960. His education was disrupted due to military service in the Yugoslav People's Army in Leskovac, Serbia from 1960 to 1962. After serving in the army, he returned to school and graduated in 1963. He went to post-graduate studies in theology at the Catholic Faculty of Theology, University of Zagreb from 1963 to 1965. There, he earned his Ph.D. in 1971 with a thesis on Bosnian-Herzegovinian Catholics on the verge of the 18th to 19th century. In the meantime, from 1965 to 1971, Džaja was a docent at the Franciscan Theology in Sarajevo, and after earning the Ph.D. in 1971, he was promoted to a rector of the said school in 1973 and held that post till 1975.

In 1975, Džaja left the Franciscan order and the professorship and went to Western Germany where he enrolled at the Ludwig Maximilian University of Munich to study history, political philosophy, and Slavic philology. There, he earned a Ph.D. in 1983 with a thesis on Bosnian-Herzegovinian confessionalism between the years 1463 to 1804. He received an award from the German South European Society (Südosteuropa – Gesellschaft) for his second Ph.D. From 1976, Džaja was a stipend of several notable German foundations, Alexander von Humboldt Foundation, Volkswagen Foundation and German Research Foundation, which financed his projects, which were successfully undertaken by Džaja as an associate of the Institute for History of Southern and Eastern Europe (Institut für Geschichte Osteuropas und Südosteuropas) of the University of Munich and the German South European Society.

Džaja acquired German citizenship in 1994 and is a member of the Society of Eastern European Historians. He retired in 2000 and lives in Munich. Since 2002 he is a member of the Academy of Sciences and Arts of Bosnia and Herzegovina.

Works 

Džaja's published works include:

Footnotes

References 

 

1935 births
Living people
People from Kupres
German people of Croatian descent
Naturalized citizens of Germany
Scholars of Ottoman history
Historians of Bosnia and Herzegovina
Bosnia and Herzegovina medievalists
20th-century Bosnia and Herzegovina historians
21st-century Bosnia and Herzegovina historians
Croatian medievalists
20th-century Croatian historians
21st-century Croatian historians
German medievalists
German historians
Writers from Munich
Bosnia and Herzegovina writers
Croats of Bosnia and Herzegovina
University of Zagreb alumni
Ludwig Maximilian University of Munich alumni
Members of the Academy of Sciences and Arts of Bosnia and Herzegovina